Nady may refer to:

 Nady, Arkansas
 Nady Systems, Inc., American company
Nady, a surname
 Ahmad Nady (born 1981), Egyptian political cartoonist, comic artist and activist
 Jay Nady (born 1947), American boxing referee
 Jeff Nady (born 1990), American football player
 Xavier Nady (born 1978), American baseball player

See also 
 Nadi (disambiguation)
 Nađ, Serbian surname
 Nagy, Hungarian surname
 Donald Naddy (1917–2017), American politician